New Dover is an unincorporated community located within Edison Township in Middlesex County, New Jersey, United States. The neighborhood began as colonial village that was part of adjacent Woodbridge Township. Along with Bonhamtown, New Durham and Stelton, it is one of the older historical communities of the township.

See also
List of neighborhoods in Edison, New Jersey

References

Neighborhoods in Edison, New Jersey
Unincorporated communities in Middlesex County, New Jersey
Unincorporated communities in New Jersey